WLPD-CD, virtual channel 30 (UHF digital channel 32), is a low-power, Class A TBN Inspire owned-and-operated television station serving Chicago, Illinois, United States, that is licensed to Plano. Owned by the Tustin, California-based Trinity Broadcasting Network, it is sister to Naperville-licensed TBN owned-and-operated station WWTO-TV (channel 35). The two stations share studios on Vision Court in Aurora and transmitter facilities in Glen Ellyn, near the campus of the College of DuPage.

History
WLPD-CD was founded June 30, 1988 as W30AL. It used to simulcast on former sister station W24AJ (channel 24) in Aurora, before it was sold to Polnet in the summer of 2009. In the 2011 edition of the Sandwich Fair Times, they stated that they would sign on "DTV 35" in November 2011, with two additional subchannels yet to be determined, with "twice the amount of power as before".

The station was sold to LocusPoint Networks for $6 million on May 10, 2013. It was then sold to TBN in late January 2018 for $13 million; LocusPoint had already established a channel sharing agreement with TBN, which moved its WWTO-TV (then licensed to La Salle) onto the space in November 2017. In October 2019, switched from 35 to 32 in Chicago, Illinois.

References

LPD-CD
Television channels and stations established in 1988
1988 establishments in Illinois
Low-power television stations in the United States
LocusPoint Networks
Trinity Broadcasting Network affiliates